{{DISPLAYTITLE:C10H12N2O4}}
The molecular formula C10H12N2O4 (molar mass: 224.21 g/mol, exact mass: 224.0797 u) may refer to:

 3-Hydroxykynurenine
 Stavudine